The Kenyan cricket team toured Canada between 29 July and 6 August 2006. The two teams played a Group B match in the 2006–07 ICC Intercontinental Cup and 2 One-day Internationals.

This was originally scheduled to be a triangular series between Bermuda, Canada and Kenya. However, after Kenya rescheduled their ODIs with Bangladesh due to their lack of financial backing, they also cancelled their matches against Bermuda. The ODI series followed the Intercontinental Cup tie between the two nations, which Canada shaded by 25 runs; however, in the short form, Kenya won after bowling Canada out for 129 in the first match and 94 in the second.

ICC Inter-Continental Cup 2006–07

One Day Internationals (ODIs)

Kenya won the series 2–0.

1st ODI

2nd ODI

References

2006 in Canadian cricket
2006 in Kenyan cricket
International cricket tours of North America
International cricket competitions in 2006